Elisabetta De Blasis (born 30 April 1974) is an Italian politician who has been serving as a Member of the European Parliament for Lega per Salvini Premier since 2022.

References

See also 

 List of members of the European Parliament for Italy, 2019–2024

Living people
1974 births
21st-century Italian politicians
21st-century Italian women politicians
21st-century women MEPs for Italy
Lega Nord MEPs
MEPs for Italy 2019–2024
People from Avezzano